PSK may refer to:

Organisations
 Revolutionary Party of Kurdistan (PŞK), a Kurdish Separatist guerrilla group in Turkey
 Kurdistan Socialist Party (PSK), a Kurdish party in Turkey
 Phi Sigma Kappa, a fraternity
 Österreichische Postsparkasse (P.S.K.), a postal savings bank in Austria
 Post Südstadt Karlsruhe, a German sports club

Science and technology
 Phase-shift keying, a digital modulation technique
 Pre-shared key, a method to set encryption keys
 Polysaccharide-K, a protein-bound polysaccharide

Other uses
 "P.S.K. What Does It Mean?", a song by Schoolly D
Pekerja Seks Komersial, Indonesian word for a prostitute